Fabio Giovanni Ceravolo (born 5 March 1987) is an Italian footballer who plays as a striker for  club Padova.

Career
Ceravolo played twice for Reggina in the Coppa Italia before joining Atalanta on loan on 20 August 2009, two days before the start of the Serie A season. As part of the deal, Reggina signed Daniele Capelli on loan.

On 2010–11 season, Atalanta acquired 50% registration rights of Ceravolo for €900,000. In June 2011, Reggina bought back Ceravolo.

On 10 January 2013, he was signed by Ternana.

After three and a half seasons spent at Ternana, he was signed on 7 July 2016 by Serie B newcomers Benevento.

On 2 September 2019, he signed a multi-year contract with Cremonese.

On 31 August 2021, he joined Serie C club Padova.

References

External links
 Reggina Calcio Official Player Profile
 Fabio Ceravolo National Team Stats at FIGC.it

1987 births
Living people
People from Locri
Footballers from Calabria
Italian footballers
Association football forwards
Serie A players
Serie B players
Serie C players
Reggina 1914 players
Vastese Calcio 1902 players
Pisa S.C. players
Atalanta B.C. players
Ternana Calcio players
Benevento Calcio players
Parma Calcio 1913 players
U.S. Cremonese players
Calcio Padova players
Italy youth international footballers
Sportspeople from the Metropolitan City of Reggio Calabria